The Knight Rocks are a group of small rocks which lie  west-northwest of the south end of Snow Island, in the South Shetland Islands. The rocks were so named by the UK Antarctic Place-Names Committee following a survey by Lieutenant Commander F.W. Hunt, Royal Navy, in 1951–52, because of their proximity to Castle Rock.

See also
 List of Antarctic and subantarctic islands

References

Rock formations of Antarctica